Steironepion moniliferum is a species of sea snail, a marine gastropod mollusc in the family Columbellidae, the dove snails.

Description

Distribution
This species occurs in the Caribbean Sea, the Gulf of Mexico and the Lesser Antilles.

References

 Rosenberg, G., F. Moretzsohn, and E. F. García. 2009. Gastropoda (Mollusca) of the Gulf of Mexico, pp. 579–699 in Felder, D.L. and D.K. Camp (eds.), Gulf of Mexico–Origins, Waters, and Biota. Biodiversity. Texas A&M Press, College Station, Texas. 
 Petit R.E. (2009) George Brettingham Sowerby, I, II & III: their conchological publications and molluscan taxa. Zootaxa 2189: 1–218.

External links

Columbellidae
Gastropods described in 1844